Xu Lai may refer to:
 Xu Lai (actress) (1909–1973), actress and secret agent
 Qian Liexian or Xu Lai, journalist and blogger